Mikrolivado is a village and a community of the Grevena municipality. Before the 2011 local government reform it was a part of the municipality of Gorgiani, of which it was a municipal district. The 2011 census recorded 56 residents in the village. The community of Mikrolivado covers an area of 13.851 km2. It used to be one of the areas of compact Aromanian settlement in the Pindus.

See also
List of settlements in the Grevena regional unit

References

Populated places in Grevena (regional unit)
Aromanian settlements in Greece